In the geometry of numbers, Ehrhart's volume conjecture gives an upper bound on the volume of a convex body containing only one lattice point in its interior.  It is a kind of converse to Minkowski's theorem, which guarantees that a centrally symmetric convex body K must contain a lattice point as soon as its volume exceeds .  The conjecture states that a convex body K containing only one lattice point in its interior as its barycenter cannot have volume greater than :

Presented in this manner, the origin is the only lattice point interior to the convex body K.

Ehrhart proved the conjecture in dimension 2 and in the case of simplices.

References
.

Geometry of numbers
Convex analysis
Conjectures